Yurd Chupan (also Romanized as Yūrd Chūpān and Yūrt Chūpān; also known as Būrt Chūpān) is a village in Chenaran Rural District, in the Central District of Chenaran County, Razavi Khorasan Province, Iran. At the 2006 census, its population was 322, in 74 families.

References 

Populated places in Chenaran County